Heritage Christian School is a private, pre-K-12 Christian school located in Milwaukee, Wisconsin. It was established in 1973 by Bethel Baptist Church as Bethel Christian Academy. Originally located in the basement of the church at North 76th Street and West Luscher Avenue, the school has moved twice, first to North 107th Street, then to its current location at South 109th Street. Growth in enrollment allowed the school to add an additional campus for the elementary school in 1989, located on Elm Grove Road in Brookfield, Wisconsin. They are now located at 3500 S Glen Park Rd in New Berlin, Wisconsin.

References

Christian schools in Wisconsin
High schools in Milwaukee
Nondenominational Christian schools in the United States
Educational institutions established in 1973
Private high schools in Wisconsin
Private middle schools in Wisconsin
Private elementary schools in Wisconsin
1973 establishments in Wisconsin